The Longacres Mile Handicap is an American Thoroughbred horse race generally held in August at Emerald Downs in Auburn, Washington. The race is open to horses three years of age and older and is run on dirt over a distance of one mile (eight furlongs). A Listed event, it is the showpiece of the Emerald Downs' race meeting.

Created by Joe Gottstein for the Longacres racetrack's third season, the race ran at that Renton, Washington track from 1935 to 1992. From 1993 to 1995 the race held its graded status as the Budweiser Mile at Yakima Meadows. Since 1996 the venue has been Emerald Downs.

In 2008, Jennifer Whitaker became the first female jockey (aboard Wasserman) to win the Longacres Mile.

The event was downgraded to Listed status in 2022.

Records
Speed record:
 1:32.90 @ 1 mile: - Point Piper (2016) (Washington state record)

Most wins:
 2 - Amble In (1946, 1948)
 2 - Trooper Seven (1980, 1981)
 2 - Simply Majestic (1988, 1989)
 2 - Stryker Phd (2014, 2015)

Most wins by a jockey:
 5 - Gary Baze (1980, 1981, 1985, 1987, 1993)
 3 - Russell Baze (1988, 2003, 2004)
 3 - Juan Gutierrez (2005, 2007, 2020)

Most wins by a trainer:
 5 - Jim Penney (1973, 1977, 2000, 2002, 2006)
 4 - Allen Drumheller (1941, 1942, 1947, 1948)
 3 - Howard Belvoir (2008, 2009, 2018)
 3 - Robert Frankel (1976, 1988, 1991), Larry Ross (1985, 2014, 2015)

Winners 
2018 Emerald Downs Media Guide

References

Horse races in Washington (state)
Emerald Downs
Open mile category horse races
Horse races in the United States
Recurring sporting events established in 1935
Auburn, Washington
1935 establishments in Washington (state)